Post PNG is the organisation responsible for postal service in Papua New Guinea. It is a member of the Universal Postal Union and was created by the Postal Services Act 1996.

Post PNG operates 40 post offices and has around 350 employees.

See also

Australia Post
Postage stamps and postal history of Papua New Guinea

References

Postal systems
Postal infrastructure
Universal Postal Union
Papua New Guinea